Harald Wolf (7 November 1955) is a German former cyclist. He competed in the individual pursuit event at the 1980 Summer Olympics.

References

External links
 

1955 births
Living people
East German male cyclists
Olympic cyclists of East Germany
Cyclists at the 1980 Summer Olympics
Sportspeople from Chemnitz
Cyclists from Saxony
People from Bezirk Karl-Marx-Stadt